Jimi (also known as Bi-Gimu) is an Afro-Asiatic language spoken in Jimi village in Bauchi State, Nigeria. 
Blench (2006) considers the Zumo (Jum) variety to be a separate language.

Notes

West Chadic languages
Languages of Nigeria